The Anti-Corruption Foundation (ACF or FBK) is a non-profit organization established in 2011 by Russian opposition figure Alexei Navalny. The FBK published investigations into alleged corruption by high-ranking Russian government officials. The organisation was funded by private donations.

On 9 October 2019, the FBK was declared a "foreign agent" by the Ministry of Justice. On 9 June 2021, the FBK was designated as an extremist organization and liquidated by the Moscow City Court. On 11 July 2022, Navalny announced the relaunch of the FBK as an international organization.

Mission 
FBK Executive Director Vladimir Ashurkov formulated the fund's strategy as pressure on the authorities in order to push them towards internal reforms, working in two directions: organizing situations in which government structures will feel pressure, and creating a real alternative to the current power system.

History

Creation 
The Foundation was registered on 9 September 2011 (account No. 7714013315, OGRN 1117799018204). According to Vladimir Ashurkov, the founders of the fund gained experience in public and transparent fundraising by organizing financing for the RosPil project. A significant amount was collected through the Yandex.Money payment system, which provided financial support for the project for a year. In parallel, the founders of the fund are working on the idea of involving on a permanent basis professional lawyers and economists in the search for and suppression of corruption schemes in the public procurement system. The contractual basis will allow to get some guarantees, in contrast to the scheme for working with volunteers.

Criminal case and "foreign agent" status 
On 3 August 2019, the Investigative Committee of Russia (SKR) opened a criminal case against the FBK, accusing them of laundering ₽1 billion (c. US$15.5 mln). Later the amount was reduced to ₽75 million (c. US$1.15 mln).

On 5 September 2019, searches were conducted at the FBK office and at the "Navalny LIVE" studio.

Soon after the 2019 Moscow City Duma election, on 12 September 2019 the SKR carried out mass raids on the FBK regional offices in 40 Russian cities.

In September 2019, various state-owned companies filed lawsuits against FBK for "organizing riots", and the courts partially satisfied them in the amount of ₽5 million (c. US$78 000).

On 8 October 2019, the police filed a lawsuit against FBK for "costs of maintaining order during rallies" in the amount of ₽18 million (c. US$280,000).

On 9 October 2019, the FBK was declared a "foreign agent" by the Ministry of Justice of the Russian Federation due to payments from the United States and Spain. One of these payments was the payment of US$50 made by Yuriy Maslikhov, a Russian citizen residing in the United States. In an interview with journalists, Yuriy Maslikhov stated that he had transferred the money from his PayPal account as an individual and he had been carrying out such donations earlier. Two other payments totalling ₽138,505.41 (c. US$2170) were carried out by Spanish citizen Roberto Fabio Monda Cardenas through CaixaBank on 6 and 17 September 2019. Answering a question of journalists how he, unable to speak Russian, found out the wire payment instructions of the Anti-Corruption Foundation after its removing from official website of the organization, Roberto Fabio Monda Cardenas was unable to explain. These payments were carried out at a time when the bank account of the Anti-Corruption Foundation was frozen at the request of the Investigative Committee of Russia. Despite the fact that the Anti-Corruption Foundation gave the money back, Ministry of Justice of Russia refused to remove the Anti-Corruption Foundation from the register of "foreign agents".

On 15 October 2019, the SKR again carried out mass raids on the FBK regional offices in 30 Russian cities.

Change of legal entity and dissolution 
In February 2019, FBK published an investigation that reported that in December 2018, mass food poisoning of children occurred in kindergartens and schools in Moscow. FBK blamed Concord Food Plant LLC, Moskovskiy Shkolnik LLC and VITO-1 LLC for this, which he linked with Yevgeny Prigozhin. Subsequently, Moscow schools No. 760 and No. 1554 assessed fines against Moskovskiy Shkolnik due to the supply of low-quality food.

In April 2019, Moskovskiy Shkolnik filed a lawsuit against FBK, Navalny, FBK lawyer Lyubov Sobol, who was in charge of the investigation, and its former employee Natalya Shilova, who was involved in the investigation.

In October 2019, the Moscow Arbitration Court ordered Navalny to pay 29.2 million rubles as compensation for lost profits and damage to professional reputation. The court ordered Lyubov Sobol and FBK to pay the same amount. The Court of Appeal upheld this decision.

In July 2020, Navalny said that he saw no reason to raise money to pay the "huge amount". He announced that the FBK would be liquidated, and that he and Sobol "until the end of Putin's power" would have to live with blocked accounts and bailiffs seizing any of their property in favor of "Putin's chef". Navalny said that he intended to revive the FBK shortly after as another legal entity.

Designation as an extremist organization
On 16 April 2021, the Moscow prosecutor office requested the Moscow City Court to designate organizations linked to Navalny including the FBK and his headquarters as extremist organizations, claiming: "Under the disguise of liberal slogans, these organizations are engaged in creating conditions for the destabilization of the social and socio-political situation." In response, Navalny aide Leonid Volkov stated: "Putin has just announced full-scale mass political repression in Russia."

On 26 April 2021, the Moscow prosecutor office ordered Navalny's network of regional offices to stop its activities, pending a ruling by the court on whether to designate them and the FBK as extremist organizations. The move was condemned by Germany and Amnesty International.

On 9 June 2021, Vyacheslav Polyga, judge of Moscow City Court, upheld the administrative claim of the prosecutor of Moscow city Denis Popov and, rejecting all the petitions of the defense, decided to recognize Anti-Corruption Foundation as an extremist organization, to liquidate it and to confiscate its assets; a similar decision had been taken against the Citizens' Rights Protection Foundation; the activity of the Alexei Navalny staff was prohibited (case No.3а-1573/2021). The case hearing was held in camera because, as indicated by advocate Ilia Novikov, the case file including the text of the administrative claim was classified as a state secret. According to advocate Ivan Pavlov, Alexei Navalny was not a party to the proceedings and the judge refused to give him such status; at the hearing, the prosecutor stated that the defendants are extremist organizations because they want a change of power in Russia and they promised to help participants of the protest with payment of administrative and criminal fines and with making complaints to the European Court of Human Rights. On 4 August 2021, First Appellate Ordinary Court located in Moscow upheld the decision of the court of first instance (case No.66а-3553/2021) and this decision entered into force that day. On 28 December 2021, it was reported that Anti-Corruption Foundation, Citizens' Rights Protection Foundation and 18 natural persons including Alexei Navalny filed a cassation appeals to the Second Cassation Ordinary Court. On 25 March 2022, the Second Cassation Ordinary Court rejected all cassation appeals and upheld the judgements of lower courts (case No.8а-5101/2022).

Relaunch as international organization
On 11 July 2022, Navalny announced the relaunch of the FBK as an international organization with an advisory board including his wife Yulia Navalnaya, Guy Verhofstadt, Anne Applebaum, and Francis Fukuyama; Navalny also stated that the first contribution to Anti-Corruption Foundation International would be the Sakharov Prize ($50,000) that was awarded to him. On 4 October, allies of Navalny said they were relaunching his regional network to fight the mobilization and war, saying it would be a "partisan underground" movement.

Notable investigations

2013
 Investigation of Vyacheslav Volodin, Sergey Neverov and other members of the United Russia party
 Investigation of Vladimir Yakunin, ex-RZD
 Investigation of Vladimir Pekhtin, MP
 Investigation of Sergey Sobyanin, Mayor of Moscow
 Investigation of Viacheslav Fetisov, member of the Federation Council, former ice hockey player

2014
 Investigation of Vladimir Zhirinovsky and his son Igor Lebedev, both members of parliament
 Investigation of Viktor Khristenko and his wife Tatyana Golikova, who were both in government
 Investigation affairs of Arkady Rotenberg and Boris Romanovich Rotenberg
 Investigation of Anton Drozdov, who was in charge of the Pension Fund of the Russian Federation

2015
 Chaika – film documenting the investigation of Prosecutor General of Russia Yury Chaika and his sons
 Investigation of Sergey Shoygu, Minister of Defence
 Investigation of Dmitry Peskov, press attaché to Vladimir Putin
 Investigation of Vladimir Yakunin and his son (addition)
 Investigation of Mikhail Kusnirovich
 Investigation of Roman Abramovich
 Investigation of Gennady Timchenko
 Investigation of Night Wolves (a motorcycle club under Putin's patronage)
 Investigation of Viacheslav Fetisov, member of the Federation Council, former ice hockey player (addition)

2016
 Investigation of Vyacheslav Volodin, Sergey Neverov and other members of the United Russia party
 Investigation of a General of the FSB right on the border
 Investigation of Yevgeny Prigozhin, chief of Web brigades and Trolls from Olgino (Russia's governmental troll army)
 Investigation of Petr Kolbin, friend and secret purse of Vladimir Putin
 Investigation of Igor Sechin's wife
 Investigation of Nikolay Merkushkin, governor of Samara Oblast
 Investigation of Igor Shuvalov, First Deputy Prime Minister of Russia
 Investigation of Maxim Liksutov in the case of Sergei Magnitsky
 Investigation of Viktor Zolotov, Director of the National Guard of Russia
 Investigation of Dmitry Rogozin, Deputy Prime Minister of Russia, in charge of the defense industry
 Investigation of Aleksandr Sidyakin, member of parliament
 Investigation of Dmitry Medvedev, Russian Prime Minister

2017
 He Is Not Dimon to You – investigation of Prime Minister of Russia Dmitry Medvedev

2018 

 Investigation of Sergei Prikhodko, First Deputy Head of the Russian Government Office

2019 

 Investigation of Andrey Metelsky, the deputy of the Moscow City Duma
 Investigation of Lyudmila Stebenkova, the deputy of the Moscow City Duma
 Investigation of Stepan Orlov, the deputy of the Moscow City Duma
 Investigation of Kirill Shchitov, the deputy of the Moscow City Duma
 Investigation of Alexei Shaposhnikov, the chairman of the Moscow City Duma
 Investigation of Vladimir Platonov, the former chairman of the Moscow City Duma
 Investigation of Natalya Sergunina, the vice-mayor of Moscow
 Investigation of Alexander Gorbenko, the vice-mayor of Moscow
 Investigation of Pyotr Biryukov, the vice-mayor of Moscow
 Investigation of Valentin Gorbunov, the head of the MCEC
 Investigation of Boris Ebzeev, member of the CEC
 Investigation of Nikolay Bulaev, the vice-chairman of the CEC
 Investigation of Anton Siluanov, Russian Minister of Finance

2021 
A Palace for Putin. The Story of the Biggest Bribe – investigation of President Vladimir Putin

2022 
 Yacht Scheherazade – investigation of President Vladimir Putin

Financing 
FBK is funded by money transfers from its supporters; mostly these are donations from ordinary people. According to Ashurkov, "constant fundraising is a necessary condition for the functioning" of the fund. The creators want to build a system that will allow the fund "not to depend on one source of funding". In April 2012, the creators estimated the fund's annual budget at approximately $300,000. If more funds are available, the fund will expand.

In 2013, the fund raised 23 million rubles through donations. In 2014 the budget was 28.5 million rubles; in 2016, it was 45 million rubles.

First public sponsors 
The first public sponsors of the fund on 13 February 2012 were the son of the founder of PJSC VimpelCom, businessman Boris Zimin (confirmed that he had already given 300,000 rubles and will give about the same amount every month) and former manager of Alfa Group Vladimir Ashurkov (confirmed that gave 300,000 rubles). On 30 May 2012, the list of the first 16 sponsors of the fund was announced:

According to Navalny, "they have already transferred 4.4 million rubles, and guaranteed another 4 million for the second half of the year", which provides most of the planned annual budget of the fund ($300,000).

According to Vladimir Ashurkov and Navalny, the negotiations took place for three months, and some of those with whom they took place eventually decided to refrain from making contributions to the fund. However, many of those who ended up supporting the project, despite not being bound by any contractual obligations, promised to make regular donations. This allows to plan the activities of the fund. In case of an increase in voluntary contributions, it is planned to develop the staff of the fund's projects, giving a special role to the anti-corruption "RosPil". Moreover, all business representatives support the fund financially as individuals.

According to Navalny, in order to help potential donors decide to support the fund and similar projects, the first of those who have already done so will announce their names. And Vladimir Ashurkov suggested that later the names of those who financially support the fund will not be made public, except for cases when the donors themselves ask for it. Ashurkov said that Alfa Group's top manager Alexei Savchenko appeared on the list of sponsors thanks to his acquaintance with him. Navalny noted that the fund has no other sponsors from Alpha. Political scientist Stanislav Belkovsky noted the interest of representatives of big business in the opposition, highlighting Mikhail Fridman.

As a funding strategy for the fund, Navalny stated the collection of small donations, but with the involvement of a wide range of donors, emphasizing the importance of mass support.

Team

Current leadership

Team members 
The FBK project managers are Ruslan Shaveddinov, Ilya Pakhomov. The legal department includes: Alexander Pomazuev, Vladlen Los, Evgeny Zamyatin. Valery Zolotukhin is also involved in the RosPil project. Investigation Department team: Anna Saltykova, Inna Evdokimova, Konstantin Diunov. In addition, the team includes video production manager Vitaly Kolesnikov, mailing list manager Yan Matveyev, editor Maria Zakharova, office manager Olga Bulaeva.

The director of the fund from 2014 to December 2018 was Roman Rubanov. Since December 2018, the head of the legal department of the fund, Ivan Zhdanov, has been appointed director.

Since February 2012, the executive director of the fund has been Vladimir Ashurkov, who was forced to leave Alfa Group to work at FBK.

Media
FBK created its own media, 'Leviathan', in order to have a possibility to register for press conferences of Vladimir Putin and make a request to authorities. Since 2016 it has been publishing one news item per day. The name 'Leviathan' was taken from Leviathan, 2014 award-winning film by Andrey Zvyagintsev.

Films
FBK has made the following films:
 Chaika, 2015 film about corruption of Prosecutor General of Russia Yury Chaika;
 He Is Not Dimon to You, 2017 film about umpteen properties used by Prime Minister of Russia Dmitry Medvedev.
Yachts, oligarchs, girls: a hunter for men exposes a bribe taker, 2018 film about informal relations between Russian businessman Oleg Deripaska and member of the Russian government Sergei Prikhodko, as well as possible sexual relations between Sergei Prikhodko and an employee of the escort agency Anastasia Vashukevich.
Putin's Palace (2021)

See also 
 2021 Russian protests
 Transparency International Russia
 2019 Moscow City Duma election
 2019 Moscow protests
 Smart Voting (Russia)

References

External links 

 

Anti-Corruption Foundation
2011 establishments in Russia
Alexei Navalny
Anti-corruption non-governmental organizations
Corruption in Russia
Non-profit organizations based in Russia
Organizations established in 2011
Transparency (behavior)
Non-profit organizations listed in Russia as foreign agents